Royal Mansour Casablanca, formerly Le Royal Mansour Méridien, was a luxury hotel in the Old Medina of Casablanca, Morocco, located just to the northwest of Sheraton Casablanca Hotel & Towers. It opened in 1952 and was the preferred hotel of the Moroccan Royalty and Nobility. It closed in 2015 and was demolished in 2017.

The hotel had 182 rooms, 23 suites and 8 conference rooms accommodating up to 700 people. Its restaurants catered Moroccan and Mediterranean cuisine and the hotel also had a piano bar and health complex with argan oil massage facilities. The Royal Grill restaurant was renovated in the early 2010s. The hotel had 7 Presidential Suites which each covering an area of 91.5 square metres. Lonely Planet described it as "the cream of Casablanca's crop of luxury hotels".

References

External links

Official site

Hotels in Casablanca
Hotels established in 1952
Hotel buildings completed in 1952
Hotels in Morocco
1952 establishments in Morocco
20th-century architecture in Morocco